In the eighth season of the Balkan International Basketball League, nine participants from Bulgaria, Kosovo, the Republic of Macedonia and Montenegro has competed.

Teams

Format
In the first round the teams were divided into two groups, each containing respectively four and five teams. Each team played every other team in its group at home and away. The top three teams from each group advanced to the second round. The teams that finished fourth and fifth in their group play additionally in a qualification group to determine two additional participants to the second round.

The eight remaining teams are again separated into two groups with four teams each. The teams that already have played during the first round kept the results between them from the first stage and played with the two remaining teams from the other group home and away games. The winners of both groups, as well the runners-up advanced to the semifinals. In them they play in home and away elimination games. The winners of those advanced to the final, decided on home and away games.

First round
The games will be played between 13 October 2015 and 20 January 2016.

Group A

Group B

Second round
The games of the qualification round are between 26 and 28 January 2016. The games of the second round will be played between 2 February and 16 March 2016.

Qualification

Group C

Group D

Semifinal

Final

External links
 BIBL official webpage
 Balkan League standings and livescores

2015–16
2015–16 in European basketball leagues
2015–16 in Kosovan basketball
2015–16 in Republic of Macedonia basketball
2015–16 in Bulgarian basketball
2015–16 in Montenegrin basketball